Kleve is an electoral constituency (German: Wahlkreis) represented in the Bundestag. It elects one member via first-past-the-post voting. Under the current constituency numbering system, it is designated as constituency 112. It is located in western North Rhine-Westphalia, comprising the district of Kleve.

Kleve was created for the inaugural 1949 federal election. Since 2017, it has been represented by Stefan Rouenhoff of the Christian Democratic Union (CDU).

Geography
Kleve is located in western North Rhine-Westphalia. As of the 2021 federal election, it is coterminous with the Kleve district.

History
Kleve was created in 1949, then known as Geldern – Kleve. It acquired its current name in the 1965 election. In the 1949 election, it was North Rhine-Westphalia constituency 26 in the numbering system. From 1953 through 1961, it was number 85. From 1965 through 1976, it was number 83. From 1980 through 1998, it was number 81. From 2002 through 2009, it was number 113. Since 2013, it has been number 112.

Originally, the constituency comprised the districts of Geldern and Kleve. In the 1965 through 1976 elections, it comprised the Geldern and Kleve districts as well as the municipalities of Rheinberg, Xanten, Alpen, and Sonsbeck from the Moers district. Since 1980, it has been coterminous with the Kleve district.

Members
The constituency has been held continuously by the Christian Democratic Union (CDU) since 1949. It was first represented by Martin Frey from 1949 to 1953, followed by Emil Solke until 1961, Felix von Vittinghoff-Schell until 1969, and Solke again until 1976. Jochen van Aerssen then served from 1976 to 1983. Heinrich Seesing was representative from 1983 to 1994. Ronald Pofalla served from 1949 to 2017. Stefan Rouenhoff has been representative since the 2017 election.

Election results

2021 election

2017 election

2013 election

2009 election

References

Federal electoral districts in North Rhine-Westphalia
1949 establishments in West Germany
Constituencies established in 1949
Kleve (district)